Sir Graham John Bower  (1848–1933), was an Irish colonial official of the British Empire.

Bower was born in Ireland.  After service in the Royal Navy, he was made Imperial secretary to the High Commissioner for Southern Africa, Sir Hercules Robinson. In September 1898, he was appointed Colonial Secretary of the Colony of Mauritius.

References

Irish knights
Knights Commander of the Order of St Michael and St George
Royal Navy officers
British diplomats
1848 births
1933 deaths